is a Japanese manga artist from Fukuoka, Fukuoka Prefecture.

Works
0→1Rebirth (Monthly Shōnen Sirius, Kodansha)
Arm of Kannon (Comic Birz, Gentosha)
 (Scola)
Boing (Weekly Young Jump, Shueisha)
 (Weekly Shōnen Champion, Akita Shoten)
 (Scola)
 (Business Jump→Grand Jump Premium→Grand Jump, Shueisha)
 (Monthly Kissca, Takeshobo)
 (Nihon Bungeisha)
Flehmen (Kindai Mahjong Original, Takeshobo; with Nenji Miyajima)
 (Weekly Young Jump, Shueisha)
 (Weekly Young Jump, Shueisha; co-work with Tadashi Ikuta)

 (Super Jump, Shueisha)
 (Business Jump, Shueisha)
 (Weekly Shōnen Champion, Akita Shoten) 
 (Weekly Shōnen Champion, Akita Shoten)
 (Weekly Young Jump→Business Jump, Shueisha; co-work with Yōzaburō Kanari)
 (Jitsugyo no Nihon Sha)
 (Scola)
 (Genzo, Web Spica, Gentosha)
 (one-shot; Grand Jump, Shueisha)
 (Weekly Manga Goraku, Nihon Bungeisha)
 (Super Jump, Shueisha)
 (Super Jump, Shueisha)
 (Business Jump, Shueisha)
 (Mister Magazine, Kodansha)
 (Weekly Shōnen Champion, Akita Shoten)
 (Shueisha)
 (Kodansha)

References

External links
 

Manga artists from Fukuoka Prefecture
People from Fukuoka